Joseph Francis Fox (1853–1903) was an Irish nationalist politician and Member of Parliament (MP) in the House of Commons of the United Kingdom of Great Britain and Ireland.

Biography
Fox was elected as an Irish Parliamentary Party MP for the Tullamore constituency at the 1885 general election, and re-elected at the 1886 general election.

At the 1892 general election, he was returned unopposed as an Irish National Federation (Anti-Parnellite) MP, and re-elected at the 1895 general election. He did not contest the 1900 general election. Professionally, he was a surgeon and physician.

External links

1853 births
1903 deaths
Irish Parliamentary Party MPs
Anti-Parnellite MPs
Members of the Parliament of the United Kingdom for King's County constituencies (1801–1922)
UK MPs 1885–1886
UK MPs 1886–1892
UK MPs 1892–1895
UK MPs 1895–1900